Trachylepis aureopunctata, the gold-spotted mabuya, is a species of skink. It is endemic to Madagascar.

References

Trachylepis
Reptiles of Madagascar
Reptiles described in 1867
Taxa named by Alfred Grandidier